Defending champion Stéphane Houdet defeated Shingo Kunieda in the final, 7–5, 5–7, 7–6(7–5) to win the men's singles wheelchair tennis title at the 2013 French Open. It was his second French Open singles title.

Seeds
  Shingo Kunieda (final)
  Stéphane Houdet (champion)

Draw

Finals

See also
 2013 French Open

References
 Draw

Wheelchair Men's Singles
French Open, 2013 Men's Singles